Andri Syahputra Sudarmanto (born 29 June 1999) is a Qatari professional footballer who plays as a midfielder for Qatar Stars League club Al-Gharafa.

Career
Born in Lhokseumawe, Andri was schooled in Aspire Academy, Qatar by his parents. He has permanent resident status in Qatar, and because of this was called by Qatar under-19 team in 2017, and made his debut in the same year in a friendly tournament against England under-18 national football team. On 23 May 2022, Syahputra was called up to the Qatar under-23 national team for the 2022 AFC U-23 Asian Cup phase.

Career statistics

Club

Notes

Honours

Club
Al Gharafa
Qatari Stars Cup: 2019

References

External links
 

1999 births
Living people
Qatari footballers
Expatriate footballers in Qatar
Association football midfielders
Al-Gharafa SC players
Qatar Stars League players
Indonesian emigrants to Qatar
Qatari people of Indonesian descent
 Indonesian expatriate footballers
Naturalised citizens of Qatar
Sportspeople from Aceh
Qatar under-20 international footballers
Qatar youth international footballers
People from Lhokseumawe